Eric Scott Norris (born May 20, 1965) is an American former stock car racing driver and stuntman. He won the 2002 NASCAR Winston West Series Championship.

Norris is also a director and directed several episodes of the TV-series Walker, Texas Ranger, which starred his father, Chuck Norris.

Early life
Norris was born on May 20, 1965, in Redondo Beach, California, the son of Dianne (née Holecheck) and Walker, Texas Ranger star Chuck Norris. Norris began racing in 1982 with his father in the SCORE Off-Road Series, but retired to study at Arizona State University.

Career

1983–1997:  Formula Ford Series to Craftsman Truck Series, and early film work 
Following his graduation, he began racing at Willow Springs Raceway and the Formula Ford Series.

On September 27, 1985, Invasion U.S.A. premiered with his father as the lead. In it, Norris is credited for stunts.

In 1986, Norris played roles in The Delta Force and Invaders from Mars. That year, Norris was a stunt player on Avenging Force.

In 1988, Norris was a stunt player for the motion pictures starring his father Hero and the Terror.

In 1990, Norris returned as a stunt player for his father in Delta Force 2: The Colombian Connection.

In 1990, Norris was credited for stunts in Beastmaster 2: Through the Portal of Time and Necessary Roughness. That year, Norris got a stunt performer credit in Star Trek VI: The Undiscovered Country.

In 1992, Norris appeared in Universal Soldier.

On December 3, 1993, Norris played the role of a thug in the film Rescue Me. That year, Norris is credited for utility stunt on Benefit of the Doubt and Best of the Best II. Also that year Norris was as a stunt player for the films Sidekicks, where he also played a biker, and Three of Hearts.

Norris' father went on to star in the long lasting hit TV show Walker, Texas Ranger,(1993-2001) where, he acted in nineteen episodes, directed nine, and produced four.

In 1994 Norris provided stunts for the film Hellbound.

Norris made his Craftsman Truck Series debut in 1997, running five races in the No. 02 Wolverine Vinyl Siding Ford F-150 for Ultra Motorsports. His best finish that season came at Watkins Glen International, where he finished 13th.

1998–present: continued racing and stunt work in films 
From 1998 to 2000, Norris worked with his father on Logan's War: Bound by Honor (1998), The President's Man (2000), and The President's Man: A Line in the Sand.

Norris ran again in 1999, when he ran both races at Texas Motor Speedway. He finished 35th in the first race, which he ran with Ultra's No. 02 Ford, and 22nd in the second race, driving the No. 4 Coca-Cola Dodge Ram for Bobby Hamilton Racing. That season, he began running in the West Series full-time, finishing tenth in points.

In 2000, Norris worked on the television film  Also that year, he made one start in the No. 5 Ultra truck at Texas, but finished 35th after being caught up in a lap 2 crash. He also won his first NASCAR race at Mesa Marin Raceway in the West Series and finished seventh in the series points.

Norris ran the No. 32 Jani-King Chevrolet Silverado for Matt Stowe in three 2001 races. His best finish of the season was a 17th at Texas. In the fall, a 23rd at California Speedway was the first time that Norris ran at a track other than Texas since 1997. He finished fifth in the standings in the West Series, but did not win another race. He won the championship by 119 points in 2002, winning twice and finishing in the top ten for every race during the season.

Norris did not return to the Craftsman Truck Series until 2004, when once again, Jim Smith and Ultra Motorsports gave Norris a two-race deal. Norris was 36th in his first start at Texas, but in his next start at Homestead-Miami, Norris finished 14th.

In 2005, Norris ran four races, all for Green Light Racing. In his first start of the year at Texas, Norris had his best career weekend to date, churning in his best career start and best career finish of 12th. There, he also led his first career lap. He only finished one of the other three starts, which was a 20th at Kansas Speedway.

He made his Busch Series debut in 2005, running a pair of races for MacDonald Motorsports. He qualified 35th and finished 41st in his debut at California in February, after the No. 72 P4OT.com Chevy broke an engine. Norris then returned at Las Vegas, finishing 35th, ten laps off the pace.

Norris returned to Green Light early in 2006, running their No. 07 truck at California. However, an early crash put him to 35th in the results. Norris competed in some more races for Green Light in 2006 with some good runs.

Ever since, Norris consistently works in the stunt department in both films and television. Some these credits includes Mike Judge's Office Space (1999), Jon Turteltaub's National Treasure (2004), Ben Affleck's The Town (2010) among many others.

In 2015, Norris was nominated at the 67th Emmy Awards for Outstanding Stunt Coordination for a Drama Series, Limited Series or Movie for his participation as a stunt coordinator on the hit show Sons of Anarchy created by Kurt Sutter.

Personal life
Norris and his brother Mike are the two sons of the union of actor Chuck Norris and Dianne Holecheck. Through his father, Norris is the nephew of Aaron Norris, the stepson of Gena Norris, has a half brother and two half sisters.

Norris has lived with his wife, Stephanie, since circa 1993 and they have four children together: three daughters, Camrynn (born 1995), Chloe (born 1998) and Chantz (born 2000), and one son Cash (born 2010). The family lives in California.

Filmography

The Delta Force (1986) – Andy, U.S. Navy Diver 
Invaders from Mars (1986) – MP #2
Universal Soldier (1992) – GR86
Rescue Me (1992) – Thug
Sidekicks (1992) – Biker #5
Top Dog (1995) – Border Patrol Officer
The Guardian (2006) – Navy Guy

Motorsports career results

NASCAR
(key) (Bold – Pole position awarded by qualifying time. Italics – Pole position earned by points standings or practice time. * – Most laps led.)

Busch Series

Craftsman Truck Series

K&N Pro Series West

ARCA Bondo/Mar-Hyde Series
(key) (Bold – Pole position awarded by qualifying time. Italics – Pole position earned by points standings or practice time. * – Most laps led.)

References

External links 

1965 births
Living people
American stunt performers
Arizona State University alumni
NASCAR drivers
Racing drivers from California
Sportspeople from Redondo Beach, California